Vasilyevka is a rural locality (a village) in Kurilovskoye Rural Settlement, Sobinsky District, Vladimir Oblast, Russia. The population was 438 as of 2010. There are 7 streets.

Geography 
Vasilyevka is located 12 km northwest of Sobinka (the district's administrative centre) by road. Lakinsky is the nearest rural locality.

References 

Rural localities in Sobinsky District